Raop is the debut album by German rapper Cro. It was released on 6 July 2012 through Chimperator Productions. It sold 60,000 copies units in Germany in its first week.

On 23 March, the first single off the album, "Easy", was released. In June 2012, "Easy" was certificated gold. The music video to the song has over 50 million views on YouTube. From 29 June to 1 July 2012, Cro released one single each day; "Du", "King of Raop", and "Meine Zeit". Music videos were also filmed for every single. All of his five released singles were placed in the top 100 in the German single charts.

Background
Cro worked on the album for one and a half months. On 19 April 2012 it was announced the album would be released on 6 July 2012. It was titled Raop after Cro's description of his music genre. He says it is a mixture between rap and pop. On 24 May 2012 the album cover was first uncovered.

Versions
The album was released in five different versions, a standard version, including 13 songs, a Vinyl LP, also including the 13 songs, a premium edition, including 2 more songs, 4 remixes, and a DVD of the making-of the album, Road to Raop, a limited "Panda Banda Deluxe" edition, which includes the 13 songs, 2 bonus songs, 4 remixes, the DVD and instrumentals of all of the songs, and an exclusive Amazon edition, which includes the 13 songs, 2 bonus songs, 4 remixes, the DVDs, instrumentals of all of the songs, a T-shirt, and a playbutton which can play all of the 13 songs.

Production
Raop was mostly produced by Cro himself. While he had often used samples for his earlier mixtapes he had to waive using portions of other songs. The reason was the short production progress which led to him not having enough time to obtain consent for using samples. Cro changed his working procedure to recording his own melodies.

Promotion

Singles
Three songs from the album were released as singles. These were released on three consecutive days. "Du" was released on 29 June 2012. "King of Raop" was released as a promotional single on 30 June. "Meine Zeit" was released on 1 July as the last promotional single. Music videos were also made for all of the three songs. On 28 June 2012 the music video for "Du" was published on tape.tv. Following that, was the video for "King of Raop" which was filmed by a company from Stuttgart called Formzwei. The video for "Meine Zeit" was released by Juice Magazine. Parts of the video were filmed on the roof terrace of Chimperator Productions. On 27 October, Cro released the music video for his fifth single "Einmal um die Welt" which was released on 2 November.

Tour
On 5 May 2012 Cro embarked on the "Road to Raop Festival Tour" during which he has been visiting many festivals. During the tour he has visited Rock am Ring and Rock im Park and Splash! Festival. The tour is supposed to end on 22 September 2012. On 1 October, Cro embarked on the "Raop Tour".

Track listing

Samples
"Easy" contains a sample of "Sunny" by Mieko Hirota
"Meine Zeit" contains a sample of "My Name Is" by Eminem
"Wir waren hier" contains a sample of "The Passenger" by Iggy Pop

Raop +5

On 5 July 2013, a new extended version of the album was released titled Raop +5 that included the 15 songs of the premium edition plus five additional tracks, including the single "Whatever" and "Chillin", "Bei dir", "Ab jetzt" and "Wie du".

Track list
"Intro" (2:46)
"King of Raop" (3:09)
"Easy" (2:52)
"Geile Welt" (2:50)
"Du" (2:54)
"Wie ich bin" (3:11)
"Meine Zeit (3:07)
"Nie mehr" (3:04)
"Jeder Tag" (2:56)
"Genauso" (3:25)
"Einmal um die Welt" (2:22)
"Wir waren hier" (2:24)
"Ein Teil" (2:55)
"Hässlich" (2:58)
"Papa schüttelt seinen Kopf" (3:06)
"Whatever" (3:11)
"Chillin" (4:32)
"Bei dir" (2:19)
"Ab jetzt" (2:49)
"Wie du" (2:32)

Personnel

Performance
 Cro - primary artist, vocals, composer, mixing, production, writer
 Carl-Michael Grabinger - drums
 Guido Craveiro - bass, drums, guitar, keys, production, trombone, mixing, remixing
 Karolina "Lean" Kovac - vocals
 Peter Weihe - guitar
 Johannes Opper - bass, guitar, composer, production
 Til Schneider - trombone

Technical

 Arne Schult – composer
 Benedikt Janny – composer
 Bobby Hebb – composer, writer
 Carl Möller – composer
 Christoph Bauss – composer
 Conscious Youths – production
 Den Kilians – composer, production
 Dexter – production
 Dominic Lorberg – composer
 Felix Göppel – composer
 Gordian Scholz – composer
 Jonas Lang – composer
 Jopez – production
 Karri Miettinen – composer
 Lasse Mellberg – composer

 Lukas Michalczyk – composer
 Markus Winter – composer
 Michael Schuermann – composer
 Morten "Pro-Moe" Edh – composer
 Narinder Singh – composer
 Niko Papadopoulos – composer
 Peerless – mixing, production
 Peter Albertz – composer
 Ralf Christian Mayer – composer, mixing, production
 Sascha "Busy" Bühren – mastering
 Shuko & Fonty – production
 Simon Hartog – composer
 Tom Krüger – mastering
 Volker "IDR" Gebhardt – mixing

Chart positions

Weekly charts

Year-end charts

Certifications

References 

2012 debut albums
Cro (rapper) albums
German-language albums